Vladimír Novák (born April 30, 1947) is a Czech painter.

Biography 
Novák was born in Louny, Czech Republic and studied at the Prague Academy of Fine Arts. He is a member of the art group 12/15: Better Late Than Never. He lives in Prague and Milan, and is married to Italian writer Serena Vitale.

Work 
Novak is from a generation of artists who began studying at art schools in the liberal atmosphere of the end of the 1960s, but which fully emerged on the art scene in about the mid-1970s, during the Normalization period, during which Czech artists were prevented from making contact with the foreign art world.

In about the mid-Eighties, Novak's paintings became more radical, moving from tranquil and reflective works to aggressive, colourful expressions of concentrated emotion, coinciding with the emergence of a new wave in the Czech art.

Exhibitions 
Vladimir Novak has taken part in many solo and group exhibitions. The most famous were the exhibitions "Man in the Wind" at the Ball-Game Hall in the Royal Gardens of Prague Castle in 1999 and "Quasiretro" at the Manes Art Gallery in Prague in 2005.

Represented in collections 
 National Gallery in Prague
 Prague City Gallery
 Museum of Fine Arts in Prague
 Aleš South Bohemian Gallery in Hluboká nad Vltavou
 Art Gallery in Carlsbad

References

External links 
 Vladimir Novak's personal web pages

1947 births
Czech painters
Czech male painters
Modern painters
Living people